Anorthosis Famagusta Volleyball is the women's volleyball team of Cypriot sports club Anorthosis Famagusta. The team is temporarily based in Nicosia due to the Turkish invasion of Cyprus in 1974.

Short History
The women's volleyball team of Anorthosis was established in the club's home town of Famagusta and was the first women's volleyball team on the island. After the Turkish invasion of Cyprus in 1974, Famagusta's residents were forced to leave the city and move elsewhere in Cyprus. The women's volleyball team stayed for a short term in Larnaca, but was re-established in 1987 in Nicosia, by Anorthosis' people who moved there after the war. The first members of the team were schoolgirls, but gradually the team grew and became competitive in the first division of women's volleyball. Their first championship came in 2002, and in 2004 Anorthosis managed to win both the championship and National Cup. Since then, Anorthosis has been one of the top four teams of the Cypriot championship, and has won seven championships, seven National Cups and nine Super Cups. That makes Anorthosis the most successful Cypriot women's team of the last 20 years.

Current volleyball squad

Coach: Dragan Djordjevic  Serbia 
Ass. Coach: Yiannis Petroudis  Greece 
President of Department:  Adamos Montanios

Titles
Cyprus Championships: 7
2002, 2004, 2006, 2010, 2013, 2018, 2019
Cyprus Cups: 7
2004, 2008, 2009, 2010, 2012, 2013, 2019
Cyprus Super Cups: 9
1993, 1994, 2002, 2004, 2010, 2012, 2017, 2018, 2019
Championship Runner-up: 12
1993, 1994, 1995, 1996, 1997, 1998, 2000, 2005, 2008, 2009, 2011, 2014
Cup Finalist: 7
1993, 1994, 1996, 1999, 2002, 2005, 2017, 2018

External links
Volleyball Official website
Women Team Facebook Page
Official website of Anorthosis Famagusta

Volleyball Court, Nicosia
Anorthosis Sports Hall (location on google maps)

Volleyball (women)
Women's volleyball teams in Cyprus
Sport in Famagusta